Tomás Pablo Elorza (30 October 1921–1 December 1999) was a Chilean politician and architect who served as President of the Senate of Chile.

He invested to Salvador Allende with the presidential band when he was elected.

Pablo Elorza was married to Ester Roa Rebolledo, mayor of Concepción (1956−1963) whose name the Estadio Municipal de Concepción was baptized.

A well regarded article that he wrote was «Aylwin, the word of a democrat».

References

External links
 BCN Profile

1921 births
1999 deaths
People from Concepción, Chile
Chilean people of Spanish descent
Chilean Roman Catholics
Conservative Party (Chile) politicians
Christian Democratic Party (Chile) politicians
Deputies of the XLIII Legislative Period of the National Congress of Chile
Presidents of the Senate of Chile
Senators of the XLIV Legislative Period of the National Congress of Chile
Senators of the XLV Legislative Period of the National Congress of Chile
Senators of the XLVI Legislative Period of the National Congress of Chile
Senators of the XLVII Legislative Period of the National Congress of Chile
University of Concepción alumni
Knights of the Order of St. Sylvester